Snowshoe is an unincorporated community in Pocahontas County, West Virginia, United States, centering on the Snowshoe Mountain ski resort. It is situated in the Allegheny Mountains at a bowl shaped convergence of two high mountain ridges — Cheat and Back Allegheny Mountains — at the head of the Shavers Fork of the Cheat River.

Snowshoe has several commercial areas, with the most prominent being The Village at Snowshoe, located at the summit of the mountain (rather than at its base).  While the area is still best known for winter activities, today the resort has extensive mountain biking trails, a popular golf course, wedding and convention areas, a number of summer outdoor activities, and also hosts a Grand National Cross Country racing event.  About 480,000 skiers visit the area each year, primarily from West Virginia and the larger cities of the Mid-Atlantic and Southeast.

Ski slopes make up  of the resort, which include the Snowshoe Basin, Western Territory, and Silver Creek areas.

History

The area, then indistinct from Slatyfork, had been logged from about 1905 to 1960, after which it was abandoned.  Thomas "Doc" Brigham discovered the mountain and believed it would be a good location to build a new ski resort.  Brigham, a dentist from North Carolina, had previously opened the Sugar Mountain and Beech Mountain ski areas.  Snowshoe Mountain opened to skiing on December 13, 1974.

Climate

The average winter season is just slightly more than 130 days each year, while the spring, summer, and fall seasons typically include a series of sports, recreation, and cultural events.

Snowshoe has a humid continental climate (Dfb).

The resort's altitude at almost a mile high provides for weather conditions that more closely resemble the rigorous winters of Northern New England than the milder climate of the Upland South.  The massive horseshoe formed by the Cheat Mountain Range creates its own micro-climate, frequently affected by orographic lift of mid-level Great Lake moisture-laden fronts, resulting in massive snowfalls.  Snowshoe averages over 13 feet of natural snow per year.

References

External links

Unincorporated communities in Pocahontas County, West Virginia
Unincorporated communities in West Virginia